The Viper 640 is an American trailerable sailboat, that was designed by Brian Bennett for racing and first built in 1996.

The Viper 640 is an accepted World Sailing class boat and the official one-design boat of the Gulf Yachting Association for its Capdevielle Series.

Production
The boat was originally built by Viper Boats in the United States and then in 2005 Rondar Raceboats of the United Kingdom was named the official class manufacturer. 400 examples had been completed by 2018.

Design

The Viper 640 was designed to combine the planing performance of a dinghy with the stability of a keelboat. The result  is a small recreational planing keelboat, built predominantly of fiberglass, with carbon fiber spars. The keel is retained in the down position with two bolts while sailing.

The boat may be optionally fitted with a small outboard motor for docking and maneuvering.

The design has a PHRF racing average handicap of 99 with a high of 111 and low of 96.

Operational history
Cruising World magazine named the design Overall Boat of the Year and top Performance One-Design of 2002, stating "the panelists agreed that the Viper is inherently simple, offers quality construction at a great price, and is extremely fun to sail. An attractive looking boat, the Viper invites a wide range of sailors to an equally wide range of sailing."

See also
List of sailing boat types

References

External links

Keelboats
1990s sailboat type designs
Sailing yachts
Trailer sailers
Sailboat type designs by Brian Bennett
Sailboat types built by Rondar Raceboats
Sailboat types built by Viper Boats